Ju Hyeong-gyeol (born 20 August 1939) is a South Korean long-distance runner. He competed in the marathon at the 1964 Summer Olympics.

References

1939 births
Living people
Athletes (track and field) at the 1964 Summer Olympics
South Korean male long-distance runners
South Korean male marathon runners
Olympic athletes of South Korea
Place of birth missing (living people)
20th-century South Korean people